Andreea Beatrice Ana (born 14 November 2000) is a Romanian freestyle wrestler. She is a three-time medalist, including gold, at the European Wrestling Championships. She is the first female wrestler representing Romania to win a gold medal at the European Wrestling Championships. In 2021, she became under-23 world champion in the 55 kg event at the U23 World Wrestling Championships held in Belgrade, Serbia. She also represented Romania at the 2020 Summer Olympics in Tokyo, Japan.

Career 

She won a bronze medal at the 2018 World U23 Wrestling Championship held in Bucharest, Romania in the 53 kg event. At the 2019 European Wrestling Championships, also held in Bucharest, Romania, she won a bronze medal in the 55 kg event. In that same year, at the 2019 World U23 Wrestling Championship held in Budapest, Hungary, she also won one of the bronze medals in the 55 kg event.

In 2020, she competed in the women's 55 kg event at the European Wrestling Championships held in Rome, Italy without winning a medal. She was eliminated in her second match by Sofia Mattsson of Sweden. In March 2021, she competed at the European Qualification Tournament in Budapest, Hungary hoping to qualify for the 2020 Summer Olympics in Tokyo, Japan. A month later, she won one of the bronze medals in the 55 kg event at the 2021 European Wrestling Championships held in Warsaw, Poland. In May 2021, she qualified at the World Olympic Qualification Tournament to compete at the 2020 Summer Olympics. She competed in the women's 53 kg event where she was eliminated in her first match by eventual bronze medalist Vanesa Kaladzinskaya of Belarus.

At the 2021 U23 World Wrestling Championships held in Belgrade, Serbia, she won the gold medal in the 55 kg event.

In February 2022, she won the gold medal in the 55 kg event at the Dan Kolov & Nikola Petrov Tournament held in Veliko Tarnovo, Bulgaria. A month later, she also won the gold medal in her event at the 2022 European U23 Wrestling Championship held in Plovdiv, Bulgaria. In March 2022, she also won the gold medal in the 55 kg event at the European Wrestling Championships held in Budapest, Hungary. This is the first gold medal for Romania in women's freestyle at the European Wrestling Championships. In the final, she defeated Oleksandra Khomenets of Ukraine.

A few months later, she won the bronze medal in her event at the Matteo Pellicone Ranking Series 2022 held in Rome, Italy. She competed in the 55 kg event at the 2022 World Wrestling Championships held in Belgrade, Serbia. She also competed in the 55kg event at the 2022 U23 World Wrestling Championships held in Pontevedra, Spain.

She won one of the bronze medals in her event at the 2023 Ibrahim Moustafa Tournament held in Alexandria, Egypt. She won the silver medal in her event at the 2023 European U23 Wrestling Championships held in Bucharest, Romania.

Achievements

References

External links 

 
 
 

2000 births
Living people
Romanian female sport wrestlers
Olympic wrestlers of Romania
Wrestlers at the 2020 Summer Olympics
European Wrestling Champions
European Wrestling Championships medalists
21st-century Romanian women
People from Mangalia